Icicle is the name of the largest ice yacht ever built. It was built for John Aspinwall Roosevelt for racing on the Hudson River, New York state in 1869.
The yacht is still, over 140 years later, recognized by the Guinness Book of Records as a world record.

John A. Roosevelt (Franklin Delano Roosevelt's Uncle) was the first Commodore of the Hudson River Ice Yacht Club (1885) at Poughkeepsie, NY. His ice yacht, "Icicle", required a railway flat car to transport.

In 1871 "Icicle" beat the "Chicago Express" train on a run between Poughkeepsie and Ossining. Early ice yacht clubs spent most of their time racing trains.

As of 2021 a man named David Janzen is building an ice boat that will beat Icicle’s world record by being 22 metres long.

References
Guinness Book of Records, 2004
https://web.archive.org/web/20070219094341/http://www.iceboat.org/ice%20boat%20timeline.htm

Ice yachting
Sports in New York (state)
1869 ships